The Japanese destroyer {{nihongo|Take|竹|}} was one of 21 s built for the Imperial Japanese Navy (IJN) in the late 1910s. She was decommissioned in 1940 before being recommissioned as a training ship. She was finally scuttled as a breakwater at Akita port in 1948.

Design and description
The Momi class was designed with higher speed and better seakeeping than the preceding  second-class destroyers. Take was powered by two Brown-Curtis geared steam turbines, each driving one propeller shaft using steam provided by three Kampon water-tube boilers. Their crew consisted of 110 officers and crewmen.

The main armament of the Momi-class ships consisted of three  Type 3 guns in single mounts; one gun forward of the well deck, one between the two funnels, and the last gun atop the aft superstructure. The guns were numbered '1' to '3' from front to rear. The ships carried two above-water twin sets of  torpedo tubes; one mount was in the well deck between the forward superstructure and the bow gun and the other between the aft funnel and aft superstructure.

Construction and career
Take, built at the Kawasaki Shipyards in Kobe, Japan, was launched on 26 August 1919 and completed on 25 December 1919. She was stricken from the Navy List on 1 February 1940 before being recommissioned as a training ship. she was finally scuttled as a breakwater at Akita port in 1948.

Notes

References

1919 ships
Ships built by Kawasaki Heavy Industries
Momi-class destroyers